The Washington secretary of state election, 1992, took place on November 3, 1992. Incumbent secretary of state Ralph Munro was re-elected.

Primary election

The primary election took place in September, with Republican incumbent Ralph Munro running unopposed. Libertarian candidate Maurice Willey also secured his party's nomination by acclamation.

In the Democratic primary, first-time candidate Jeanne Dixon - who had spent less than $1,000 on her campaign - soundly defeated the party-backed Juanita Garrison by more than 100,000 votes. The shock outcome was widely ascribed to the fact that Dixon's name was very similar to that of the well-known astrologer Jeane Dixon. Dixon rejected the theory, instead claiming voters were aware of her due to the many garden club meetings she frequently attended. An unemployed former real estate agent who lived on disability insurance due to a glandular condition that left her unable to work, Dixon had never before held public office, though had run for Governor of Washington in 1988 (a race in which she was described by the Seattle Times as a "throwaway candidate"). Garrison, meanwhile - the stepdaughter of Warren Magnuson - had been recruited and supported by the Democratic Party in an effort to break a longtime Republican lock on the secretary of state's office.

Contacted by the Associated Press for reaction to the election results, astrologer Jeane Dixon - a resident of Washington, D.C. - said "I hope my name brings her luck." Washington State Democratic Party executive-director Jeff Smith, meanwhile, described the outcome of the Democratic primary as "a tragedy for voters."

General election

In the general election, Ralph Munro was easily re-elected secretary of state.

References

secretary of state
1992
1992 United States state secretary of state elections